Khuk (also Romanized as Khūk and Khowk; also known as Qeyām Kandī and Qīām Kandī) is a village in Yowla Galdi Rural District, in the Central District of Showt County, West Azerbaijan Province, Iran. At the 2006 census, its population was 309, in 82 families.

References 

Populated places in Showt County